The 1975–76 Notre Dame Fighting Irish men's basketball team represented the University of Notre Dame during the 1975–76 season. The team was coached by Digger Phelps and was ranked in the Associated Press poll for the entirety of the season. The Fighting Irish finished the regular season with a record of 23–6. In the 1976 NCAA Division I Basketball Tournament, the Fighting Irish defeated Cincinnati in the first round, 79–78 and then lost to Michigan in the second round.

Roster

Schedule

Team players drafted into the NBA

References

Notre Dame Fighting Irish
Notre Dame Fighting Irish
Notre Dame
Notre Dame
Notre Dame Fighting Irish men's basketball seasons